The Philemon Russell House is a historic house in Somerville, Massachusetts. Philemon Robbins Russell was a farmer who owned  of apple orchards near Russell Street. This land was converted to house lots for development by Captain Gilman Sargent in 1845 creating Orchard Street, Russell Street and Cottage Place.  His house, built 1845, is one of the best-preserved side-hall Greek Revival farmhouses in the city. It was moved to the current location from somewhere else.  According to the Somerville Journal, page 6, a fire occurred that  badly damaged the upper portion of the house.  The cause was a mystery and the estimated damage was $2,000. The Boston Daily Globe reported the first took place on On February 26, 1905.

The house was listed on the National Register of Historic Places in 1989.

See also
 National Register of Historic Places listings in Somerville, Massachusetts

References

Houses completed in 1845
Houses on the National Register of Historic Places in Somerville, Massachusetts